Bianca Donati (born 5 June 1995) is an Argentinian field hockey player.

Background
Donati was born in Bahia Blanca in Argentina. She started paying hockey since she was five years old with her siblings.

Hockey career
Donati was part of the Argentina Junior National Team at the 2016 Junior World Cup where the team won the gold medal, defeating the Netherlands in the final.

In 2017, Donati was called into the senior national women's team. She competed in the team that finished fifth at the 2016-17 Hockey World League Final in Auckland.

References

External links
 

Living people
1995 births
Argentine female field hockey players
Female field hockey defenders
Las Leonas players